The Islamabad United is a franchise cricket team that represents Islamabad in the Pakistan Super League (PSL). They were one of the six teams that competed in the 2022 Pakistan Super League. The team was coach by Azhar Mahmood, and captained by Shadab Khan.

Squad
 Players with international caps are listed in bold.
 Ages are given as of the first day of the season, 27 January 2022.

Season standings

Points table

Fixtures

Playoffs

Eliminator 1

Eliminator 2

References

External Links 
 Team Records in 2022 at ESPNcricinfo

2022 Pakistan Super League
United in 2022
2022